The 74th Primetime Emmy Awards honored the best in American prime time television programming from June 1, 2021, until May 31, 2022, as chosen by the Academy of Television Arts & Sciences. The awards ceremony was held live on September 12, 2022, and was preceded by the 74th Primetime Creative Arts Emmy Awards on September 3 and 4, at the Microsoft Theater in Downtown Los Angeles, California. The ceremony was broadcast in the United States on NBC and Peacock. During the ceremony, Emmy Awards were handed out in 25 categories. The event was produced through Done and Dusted and Hudlin Entertainment and was directed by Hamish Hamilton. Kenan Thompson was the ceremony's host.

At the main ceremony, The White Lotus received the most awards with five, including Outstanding Limited or Anthology Series. Ted Lasso won four awards, including its second consecutive award for Outstanding Comedy Series, while Abbott Elementary won two awards and Hacks won one. Succession led all dramas with three wins, including its second Outstanding Drama Series win; Squid Game received two awards, and Euphoria and Ozark received one each. Other winning programs include Dopesick, The Dropout, Jerrod Carmichael: Rothaniel, Last Week Tonight with John Oliver, Lizzo's Watch Out for the Big Grrrls, and Saturday Night Live. Including Creative Arts Emmys, The White Lotus led all programs with 10 wins; HBO and HBO Max led all networks and platforms with 38 total wins.

Winners and nominees

The nominations for the 74th Primetime Emmy Awards were announced on July 12, 2022, by J. B. Smoove and Melissa Fumero alongside Television Academy CEO Frank Scherma. Including nominations at the 74th Primetime Creative Arts Emmy Awards, Succession led all programs with 25 nominations, followed by Ted Lasso and The White Lotus with 20 nominations each. HBO and HBO Max combined for 140 nominations, more than any other network or platform; HBO's 108 nominations surpassed Netflix's second-place tally of 105. Succession earned 14 nominations for acting, surpassing the previous drama series record of 12 set by The West Wing and the overall record of 13 set by Roots and Rich Man, Poor Man. Squid Game became the first non-English-language program to be nominated for Outstanding Drama Series. Quinta Brunson became the first black woman to earn three comedy nominations in a single year for Abbott Elementary. BET, through its streaming service, earned its first major scripted series nomination with The Ms. Pat Show.

The winners were announced on September 12, following the Creative Arts Emmys on September 3 and 4. HBO and HBO Max led all networks and platforms with 38 total wins, reclaiming the top spot after falling behind Netflix the previous year; the latter only won 26 after winning 44 at the previous ceremony. The White Lotus led all programs with five major wins, while Succession and Ted Lasso each won their second overall series awards. The former also led all programs when including Creative Arts Emmys with 10. For their work on Squid Game, Lee Jung-jae and Hwang Dong-hyuk became the first Asians to win for Outstanding Lead Actor in a Drama Series and Outstanding Directing for a Drama Series, respectively. At age 26, for her performance in Euphoria, Zendaya became the youngest two-time winner for acting and the first black woman to win Outstanding Lead Actress in a Drama Series twice. Sheryl Lee Ralph became the second black actress to win Outstanding Supporting Actress in a Comedy Series for her performance in Abbott Elementary, following Jackée Harry's win 35 years earlier. Abbott Elementary creator Brunson also became the second black woman to win Outstanding Writing for a Comedy Series, following Lena Waithe's win for Master of None in 2017.

Winners are listed first, highlighted in boldface, and indicated with a double dagger (‡). For simplicity, producers who received nominations for program awards have been omitted.

Programs

Acting

Lead performances

Supporting performances

Directing

Writing

Governors Award
The Governors Award was presented to the Geena Davis Institute on Gender in Media "in recognition of their efforts to promote gender balance and foster inclusion throughout the entertainment industry".

Nominations and wins by program
For the purposes of the lists below, "major" constitutes the categories listed above (program, acting, directing, and writing), while "total" includes the categories presented at the Creative Arts Emmy Awards.

Nominations and wins by network
To avoid disputes over how different services combined nominations, the Television Academy did not release its own tally of nominations by network. Totals are based on platforms listed with each nomination.

Presenters
The awards were presented by the following people:

Ceremony information

In April 2022, the Academy of Television Arts & Sciences (ATAS, also known as the Television Academy) announced that the 74th Primetime Emmy Awards would be held on September 12; the corresponding Creative Arts ceremonies were announced for September 3 and 4. The main ceremony was shown on NBC as part of a four-year rotation; the ceremony was moved to a Monday to accommodate NBC's Sunday Night Football coverage. The broadcast was also streamed on Peacock. The ceremony was produced by Hudlin Entertainment and Done and Dusted, with Reginald Hudlin, Ian Stewart, Byron Phillips and Jane Mun serving as executive producers. This marked Hudlin's third year and Done and Dusted's fifth year producing the Emmys ceremony. Hamish Hamilton served as director for the fifth time. The ceremony returned to the Microsoft Theater in Downtown Los Angeles, California, after two years at other venues due to the COVID-19 pandemic. According to Television Academy president Maury McIntyre, while an outdoor option similar to the previous year was considered, they wanted to return with an audience and to continue their relationship with the Microsoft Theater.

On August 9, 2022, it was announced that Kenan Thompson would host the ceremony. The producers reportedly approached Chris Rock and Dwayne Johnson to host the ceremony, but had no success. NBC late-night hosts Jimmy Fallon and Seth Meyers – both past Emmys hosts – were also reportedly uninterested in the role. Scherma initially indicated that a hostless ceremony was being considered, but the Television Academy quickly clarified that such an option was not being pursued. Following the announcement, Thompson called the opportunity "ridiculously exciting", even with the relatively short window before the ceremony, adding that he "just want[ed] to celebrate creative people in this business". Alongside Thompson, Zedd and comedian Sam Jay served as the ceremony DJ and announcer, respectively.

Building from the previous year, the ceremony replaced stadium seating for the nominees and their plus-ones with tables. Stewart commented that the format had been well-received before and said, "We've taken that concept and expanded it out." Screens were placed around the tables to create immersion into "different worlds". Other audience members remained in traditional theater seating. In accordance with guild rules, production members, nominees, and guests had to show a negative COVID-19 test before attending. Masking was required for the crew but optional for audience members; most attendees did not wear masks. Regarding changes after the Will Smith–Chris Rock slapping incident at the previous Academy Awards, Scherma expressed confidence in the event's security and staff, while Stewart emphasized the goal of making the event feel inclusive. The ceremony also sought to "celebrate all of TV", in Hudlin's words, by recognizing shows that were not nominated; one way this was done was by inviting actors from those programs as presenters.

Emmys realignment
In December 2021, ATAS and the National Academy of Television Arts and Sciences (NATAS) announced a major realignment of the Emmy Award ceremonies. This was in response to the growth of streaming television, which blurred the lines in determining which shows should fall under the Daytime or Primetime Emmys. The two ceremonies' scopes were changed to revolve around factors such as the genres, production, and frequency of such programming, rather than strictly dayparts.

Among the major changes that took effect at the 49th Daytime Emmy Awards in June 2022 and at the 74th Primetime Emmy Awards in September 2022:

 Daytime dramas, as defined as "any multi-camera, weekday daily serial, spin-off or reboot", remained at the Daytime Emmys, but most other scripted dramas and comedies had to enter into the Primetime Emmys. For example, the streaming limited series Days of Our Lives: Beyond Salem could still enter into the Daytime Emmys because it is a spin-off of the daytime soap opera Days of Our Lives, but other programs such as The Bay had to move to the Primetime Emmys.
 Talk shows were divided between the Daytime and Primetime Emmys based on "format and style characteristics reflective of current programming in the daytime or late night space". Such programs could petition to switch ceremonies, such as the previous Daytime Emmy winner The Ellen DeGeneres Show, whose format is more similar to the late night talk shows awarded at the Primetime Emmys.
 All children's programming categories were moved to the new Children's and Family Emmy Awards.
 Categories for morning shows were moved from the Daytime Emmys to the News and Documentary Emmy Awards or to the Daytime Emmys' talk show categories, depending on format.

Categories for game shows and instructional programming remained split this year between the Daytime and Primetime Emmys, with their realignment to be determined in 2023.

Other rule changes
Several other rule changes were implemented for the ceremony. Most notably, programs were no longer categorized as dramas or comedies based on runtime; instead, producers determined where their programs were submitted, with the Television Academy reserving the right to review decisions. The distinction had previously been adjusted in 2015 to consider half-hour programs as comedies and hour-long programs as dramas. The exception to the new rule was that programs under 20 minutes had to be submitted in short-form categories. The Television Academy also revised the description for the Governors Award and clarified that limited series must fully resolve story arcs with "no on-going storyline and/or main characters in subsequent seasons".

In July, the categories for the broadcast were revealed. Outstanding Variety Special (Live) and Outstanding Variety Special (Pre-Recorded) were moved to the Creative Arts ceremonies, while Outstanding Writing for a Variety Special replaced Outstanding Writing for a Variety Series in the main broadcast.

Critical reviews and viewership
The broadcast generally received mixed to negative reviews from critics. Alan Sepinwall and Rob Sheffield from Rolling Stone each praised the speeches from the winners, particularly Ralph's, while criticizing many of the production elements such as the In Memoriam segment and the frequent play-off music. The Hollywood Reporters Daniel Fienberg criticized other production decisions, such as the opening number, the dedicated DJ and announcer, and the various montages. He ultimately found the broadcast forgettable, quipping in reference to the Academy Awards six months prior: "But hey, at least it wasn't a catastrophe?" Mike Hale, writing for The New York Times, found the scripted portions weak and remarked that there "seemed to be a consensus, organized or not, to keep it light".

The Boston Globes Yvonne Abraham complimented Thompson as "a likeable host" and praised several of the speeches and presenters, but she ultimately found the ceremony to be "just another TV awards show... long and stuffed with unnecessary montages and comedy bits". Robert Lloyd of the Los Angeles Times also complimented Thompson despite being "saddled to some dumb bits". However, he criticized the show's pace, calling it fast and "somewhat exhausting", and compared the atmosphere to "watching [a party] through a window". Conversely, Manuel Betancourt was more positive in his review for The A.V. Club, remarking that the program "offered plenty of laughs" and that it "served as a reminder that the boob tube still has the power to inspire wide-eyed girls and boys alike".

Competing with the season premiere of Monday Night Football on ABC and ESPN, the ceremony was viewed by 5.92 million people in the United States, making it the least-viewed in Emmys history, representing a 19% decrease over the previous year's ceremony. It also achieved a 1.09 rating among adults ages 18–49. The ratings figures only include those who watched the telecast on NBC, and not those who streamed it on Peacock.

In Memoriam
The annual In Memoriam segment was presented by Anthony Anderson and featured John Legend debuting his song "Pieces".

 Betty White – performer
 David Warner – performer
 Emilio Delgado – performer
 Peter Scolari – performer
 Yoko Shimada – performer
 Burt Metcalfe – director, writer, producer
 Jay Sandrich – director
 George Yanok – writer
 John Bowman – writer
 Jak Knight – performer, writer
 Dwayne Hickman – performer
 Tony Dow – performer
 Roger E. Mosley – performer
 Howard Hesseman – performer
 Lisa R. Anderson – producer
 Amy Lin Johnson – producer
 Charles Cappleman – executive
 Mercedes Leanza – executive
 Marc Pilcher – makeup artist
 Tony Walton – set designer, costume designer
 Willie Garson – performer
 Robert Morse – performer
 Bernard Shaw – journalist
 Larry Sellers – performer, stunts
 Marilyn Bergman – lyricist
 David A. Arnold – performer, writer
 George Shapiro – manager, producer
 Estelle Harris – performer
 Liz Sheridan – performer
 John Madden – sports commentator
 Vin Scully – sports announcer
 Nichelle Nichols – performer
 Bob Saget – performer
 James Caan – performer
 Gilbert Gottfried – performer
 Cheslie Kryst – performer, attorney
 Dean Stockwell – performer
 Tony Sirico – performer
 Jean-Marc Vallée – director
 Michael Nesmith – performer, producer
 Louie Anderson – performer
 Anne Heche – performer
 Paul Sorvino – performer
 Ray Liotta – performer
 Sidney Poitier – performer, director

Notes

References

External links
 
 74th Primetime Emmy Awards at Emmys.com
 2022 Emmy Episode Submissions at Gold Derby
 Academy of Television Arts and Sciences website

2022 awards in the United States
2022 in American television
2022 in Los Angeles
2022 television awards
2022 television specials
074
September 2022 events in the United States
Television shows directed by Hamish Hamilton (director)